Vražda v salonním coupé is a stage comedy play in the repertory of the Jára Cimrman Theatre. It was written by Zdeněk Svěrák and Ladislav Smoljak, and co-authorship is credited to the fictional Czech inventor, philosopher and dramatist Jára Cimrman. The play premiered on 14 May 1970 in Malostranská beseda, Prague. As of 1986, the play had been performed 556 times.

Cast

Play 
Zdeněk Svěrák or Ladislav Smoljak as Inspector Trachta 
Miloň Čepelka or Petr Brukner as Jindřich Hlaváček, trainee policeman 
Jaroslav Weigel, Jan Kašpar, Bořivoj Penc, Oldřich Unger or Jaroslav Vozáb as Manufacturer Bierhanzel 
Jan Hraběta, Pavel Vondruška, Jan Klusák or Jiří Menzel as Manufacturer Meyer 
Václav Kotek, Genadij Rumlena, Josef Koudelka, František Petiška, Jaroslav Vozáb or Jan Kašpar as Train steward

Film 
Jiří Zahajský as Inspector Trachta
Marek Brodský as Jindřich Hlaváček
Rudolf Hrušínský as Mr. Hlaváček 
Blažena Holišová as Mrs. Hlaváčková 
Josef Abrhám as Professor Žalud
Veronika Jeníková as Růženka
Jaroslava Adamová as Keeper's brothel
Petr Čepek as Police president
Vlastimil Brodský as Oulík
Rudolf Hrušínský ml. as Sýkorka
Jiří Kodet as Bierhanzel
Jaroslava Krettschmerová as Mrs. Pecháčková
Jaroslav Weigel as Mr. Pecháček
Zdeněk Srstka as Mr. Bedříšek
Zdeněk Svěrák as Mr. Jelínek

See also 
Jára Cimrman

External links 
Critique in Czechoslovak Film Database
Critique in ČSFD.cz
Film in IMDb.com
Play in IMDb.com

Comedy plays
Czech plays
Plays by Zdeněk Svěrák and Ladislav Smoljak